POTW may refer to:
 People of the Web
 Player of the Week (disambiguation)
 Publicly owned treatment works